Phalangipus longipes is a species of crabs in the family Epialtidae.

Description
The chelopoda are large and robust. Ambulatory legs are cylindrical, smooth, very long and slender. The first  pair of leg is the longest,  about  six times of the length of the carapace. Body is light reddish above, mottled with white. Below it is white, with whitish feet, annulated with red.

The barnacles of the species Sacculina granulosa are parasitic castrators of these crabs.

Distribution
This species is present in Northeastern and northern Australia, Indian Ocean, Sri Lanka, Andaman Sea, west Malay Peninsula, Strait of Malacca, China, Hong Kong, Taiwan, Singapore, Gulf of Thailand, Philippines and Indonesia.

References

 Liu J.Y. Ruiyu (ed.). (2008). Checklist of marine biota of China seas. China Science Press. 1267 pp.

External links
 Spinnenkrabbe

Majoidea
Crustaceans described in 1758
Taxa named by Carl Linnaeus